Patrick Joseph Meehan (28 March 1877 – 5 July 1929) was an Irish solicitor, politician and Irish Parliamentary Party MP. He represented Queen's County Leix in the House of Commons of the United Kingdom of Great Britain and Ireland from 1913 to 1918. He was returned unopposed following the death of his predecessor, his father Patrick Aloysius Meehan.

During his time as an MP he followed his father's policy of calling for land redistribution, which caused some controversy.

His constituency was abolished at the next general election in 1918.

After the establishment of the Irish Free State, he was appointed state solicitor for Laois and later became country registrar. He was involved in sports, particularly Irish coursing, and owned many well-known greyhounds.

He died at his home at Annebrook, Portlaoise, on 5 July 1929.

References

Parliamentary Election Results in Ireland, 1801–1922, edited by B.M. Walker (Royal Irish Academy 1978)
Seamus Dunne, Patrick Joseph Meehan, the last M.P. for Leix.
Patrick F. Meehan, The Members of Parliament for Laois and Offaly.

External links 
 
 

1877 births
1929 deaths
Irish Parliamentary Party MPs
Politicians from County Laois
Members of the Parliament of the United Kingdom for Queen's County constituencies (1801–1922)
UK MPs 1910–1918